The road race is one of two road bicycle racing events held at the Summer Olympics, the other being the time trial. The road race is a mass start, distinguished from the separate starts of the time trial. The men's road race was first held at the 1896, was not held again for 40 years, then has been held every Summer Games since the 1936 Summer Olympics. The women's event was first contested at the 1984 Summer Olympics, being the first women's cycling event (track events were added in 1988).

A team event, with the results of the individual event being used to place the teams, was held from 1936 to 1956 (4 times).

Medalists

Men

Multiple medalists

Medalists by country

Women

Multiple medallists

Medallists by country

Men's team

A men's team event was held for four Games—1936, 1948, 1952, and 1956. It was not a separate competition, but an event that involved the results of the individual road race. The Belgian team, winners in 1948, were unaware that there was a team competition and left London without receiving their medals. For the first three editions of the event, the times of the fastest three cyclists (out of a maximum four individual competitors) for each nation were summed. In the final edition in 1956, a point-for-place system was used instead. In 1936 and 1948, only the top three cyclists for each team were awarded medals. In 1952 and 1956, all members of the team—including the cyclist whose score did not count—were medalists.

Medalists by country

Intercalated Games

The 1906 Intercalated Games were held in Athens and at the time were officially recognised as part of the Olympic Games series, with the intention being to hold a games in Greece in two-year intervals between the internationally held Olympics. However, this plan never came to fruition and the International Olympic Committee (IOC) later decided not to recognise these games as part of the official Olympic series. Some sports historians continue to treat the results of these games as part of the Olympic canon.

Fernand Vast won the 1906 title, with France sweeping the medals as Maurice Bardonneau finished second and Edmond Luguet third.

References

Road race